The 2016 season was the 107th season in the history of Sport Club Corinthians Paulista.

Background

Kit
 Home (May 2016 onward): White shirt, black shorts and white socks;
 Away (2016): Black shirt, white shorts and black socks;
 Third (September 2016 onward): Purple/blue shirt, blue shorts and blue socks.

Previous kits
 Home (Until May 2016): White shirt, black shorts and white socks.
 Third (Until September 2016): Orange shirt, orange shorts and orange socks.

Squad
As of 20 November 2016

 (on loan from Ponte Preta)

 (on loan from Botafogo-SP)

Managerial changes
On 15 June, Tite accepted an invitation to become Brazil's manager. Assistant manager Fábio Carille assumed the role as a caretaker until 19 June, managing the club against Fluminense and Botafogo. On the same day, Corinthians announced Cristóvão Borges as the new manager. 

On 17 September, Borges was fired after losing a home match against Corinthians's biggest rival Palmeiras, which ended a 34-match unbeaten run at Arena Corinthians. On the same day, Carille was announced as interim manager. This time, until the end of the season. However, on 14 October it was announced that former two-time manager Oswaldo de Oliveira signed as the new head coach.

Transfers

Transfers in

Loans in

Transfers out

Loans out

Squad statistics

Overview

Pre-season and friendlies

Last updated: 23 January 2016Source:

Campeonato Paulista

For the 2016 Campeonato Paulista, the 20 teams are divided in four groups of 5 teams (A, B, C, D). They will face all teams, except those that are in their own group, with the top two teams from each group qualifying for the quarterfinals. The six overall worst teams will be relegated.

Statistics

First stage

Knockout stages

Libertadores

Second stage

Knockout stages

Tied 2–2 on aggregate, Nacional won on away goals.

Campeonato Brasileiro

Results

Copa do Brasil

Due to being qualified to the 2016 Copa Libertadores, Corinthians entered the competition on the round of 16, in August.

Knockout stages

Corinthians won 2–1 on aggregate.

Cruzeiro won 5–4 on aggregate.

See also
List of Sport Club Corinthians Paulista seasons

Notes

References

Sport Club Corinthians Paulista seasons
Corinthians